The 2021 Redditch Borough Council elections took place on 6 May 2021 to elect members of Redditch Borough Council, a district-level local authority in Worcestershire, England.

Results summary

Ward results

Batchley & Brockhill

Central

Church Hill

Greenlands

Headless Cross & Oakenshaw

Lodge Park

Matchborough

West

Winyates

References

Redditch Borough Council election
2021
2020s in Worcestershire
May 2021 events in the United Kingdom